Tiziana Domínguez González (born 16 November 1985) is a fashion designer and artist.  she is the creative director of the company Adolfo Domínguez, as well as a painter and sculptor. She is the youngest of the three daughters of designer Adolfo Domínguez and Elena González. Tiziana is part of the third generation of the company, founded in 1973 from a tailor’s shop run by her grandfather.

Training 
Tiziana started her training abroad when she was seven years old. She studied in Great Britain, Austria and France, where she learned English, German and French. After finishing her A-levels in Great Britain, she studied a foundation course in Art & Design at Leeds College of Art. She later moved to Vermont, USA, where she earned a Bachelor of liberal arts BA with a major in economics in Middlebury College.
In 2017, she earned a AAS fashion design degree at parsons.

Design 
From her post as Creative Director, Tiziana Dominguez designs the company’s collections, along with her father. She introduced ecological materials in all collections and backs sustainable fashion. 
In 2011, she presented her first 100% ecological line: ‘Green Me’, designer clothes made from organic and recycled fabrics.

Painting and sculpture 
In May 2011, she presented her first painting exhibition, "Ants, horses & other relatives". This was a figurative, expressionist collection, with a lot of colour, where she mixes oil paints with sand, coffee, sawdust, plants, insects and other materials. Her painting is inspired by animals and nature, and her canvases are often transferred to the prints in the collections presented at Cibeles Madrid Fashion Week and her sculptures inspire the designs of the company’s jewellery.

Corporate ethics 
In 2009, she founded the Corporate Social Responsibility Department (CSR) at Adolfo Dominguez S.A. Her achievements include the publication of the Animal Welfare Policy (2010). Through this document, the company rejects the use of exotic animal skins, as well as violent activities or animal abuse, such as plucking feathers from live birds or mulesing. They only use leather for bags and accessories, provided that it has certification that it comes from animals bred for food.

Personal life 
Tiziana Domínguez was married to Juan Verde from 2011 to 2018. They have two children together.

References

External links 
 Official website of Adolfo Dominguez
 Adolfo Dominguez in Fashion from Spain
 Green Me in Fabrics for Freedom
 Tiziana Dominguez: fusión de disciplinas
 La rentrée de Adolfo Dominguez
 Adolfo Dominguez catwalks on Vogue.es
Green Me, eco collection by Tiziana Dominguez
Tiziana Dominguez on Vogue India
Tiziana Dominguez's paintings
Tiziana Dominguez interview
Tiziana Dominguez for India's national newspaper

Spanish fashion designers
Spanish women fashion designers
Middlebury College alumni
Alumni of Leeds Arts University
People from Ourense
1985 births
Living people